The 1987 Kansas Jayhawks football team represented the University of Kansas as a member of the Big Eight Conference during the 1987 NCAA Division I-A football season. In their second and final season under head coach Bob Valesente, the Jayhawks compiled an overall record of 1–9–1 with a mark of 0–6–1 against conference opponents, tied for in seventh place in the Big 8, and were outscored by opponents by a combined total of 398 to 135. The team played home games at Memorial Stadium in Lawrence, Kansas.

The team's statistical leaders included Kelly Donohoe with 981 passing yards, Arnold Snell with 691 rushing yards, and Willie Vaughn with 672 receiving yards. Team captains were selected game by game.

Schedule

References

Kansas
Kansas Jayhawks football seasons
Kansas Jayhawks football